Scott MacIntosh (born 24 August 1973) is a Canadian boxer. He competed in the men's light middleweight event at the 2000 Summer Olympics.

References

External links
 

1973 births
Living people
Canadian male boxers
Boxers at the 1998 Commonwealth Games
Boxers at the 1999 Pan American Games
Olympic boxers of Canada
Boxers at the 2000 Summer Olympics
Commonwealth Games silver medallists for Canada
Pan American Games silver medalists for Canada
Commonwealth Games medallists in boxing
Pan American Games medalists in boxing
People from Sydney, Nova Scotia
Sportspeople from the Cape Breton Regional Municipality
Light-middleweight boxers
Medalists at the 1999 Pan American Games
Medallists at the 1998 Commonwealth Games